The Volvo LV4 was a light truck produced by Swedish automaker Volvo between 1928 and 1930. The designation LV4 stands for LastVagn (“truck”), 4 cylinders.

History

Volvo introduced its first truck, LV Series 1, in early 1928. The truck shared many components with Volvos passenger cars ÖV4 and PV4, including powertrain, but the truck had a more powerful chassis which was built on two different wheelbases: 3.3 and 3.7 m. Despite the small four-cylinder side-valve engine the truck was a sales success, unlike the passenger cars.

After an initial series of 500 Series 1 trucks, Volvo presented the stronger LV Series 2 in the fall of 1928. Many components had been strengthened to better fit a truck and the axle track had been widened.

References

External links 

 Volvo Trucks Global - history
 Swedish brass cars - picture gallery
 Volvo Trucks Databank 

LV4
Vehicles introduced in 1928